Appannagouda Patil was a freedom fighter and prominent leader in the co-operative movement of Karnataka.

Notable works
He was the reason behind establishment of The Hukeri Rural Electric Cooperative Society which came into existence on 31 July 1969.

Recognition
His chair has been set up at Rani Channamma University, Belagavi in tribute to his contributions to the co-operative movement.

The Hukkeri Rural Electric Co-Operative Society which is India's first electric co-operative society runs a unit under his name that is involved in manufacturing of cement poles as an alternative to iron poles.

References

Indian independence activists